National Highway 31 (NH 31) is a primary national highway in India. It starts from Unnao in Uttar Pradesh and passes through Bihar and terminates at its crossing with State Highway 10 (West Bengal) at Samsi in Malda district of West Bengal. SH 10 (WB) connects Samsi to NH 12.

Route
National highway 31 transits across three states of India in east - west direction.

Uttar Pradesh
Unnao, Lalganj, Raebareli, Salon, Pratapgarh, Machhlishahr, Jaunpur, Varanasi, Ghazipur, Ballia

Bihar
Chhapra, Hajipur, Patna, Bakhtiyarpur, Nawada, Mokama, Barh, Begusarai, Khagaria, Bihpur, Kora, Katihar

West Bengal
Harishchandrapur,Malda

Junctions list

Uttar Pradesh

  Terminal at Unnao
  near Lalganj
  near Raebareli
  near Salon
  near Pratapgarh
  near Pratapgarh
  near Pratapgarh
  near Mungra Badshahpur
  near Jaunpur
  near Jaunpur
  near Jaunpur
  near Varanasi
  near Ghazipur
  near Phephna
  near Ballia

Bihar
  near Buxar
  near Chhapra
  near Chhapra
  near Chhapra
  near Hajipur
  near Hajipur
  near Patna
  near Fatuha
  near Bakhtiyarpur
  near Barh
  near Mokama
  near Barauni
  near Munger
  near Maheshkhunt
  near Bihpur
  near Kora
  near Katihar
West Bengal
  Terminal near Malda

Interactive map

See also 

 List of National Highways in India
 List of National Highways in India by state

References

External links
 NH 31 on OpenStreetMap

National highways in India
National Highways in Uttar Pradesh
National Highways in Bihar
National Highways in West Bengal